Clement Sabine (c. 1831 – 27 November 1903) was a manager of several large pastoral properties in the early days of South Australia.

History
Sabine was born in Bury St Edmonds, Suffolk to John Sabine and Adelaide Isham Sabine (née Eppes) and emigrated with his parents, two brothers and two sisters aboard the barque Derwent, arriving at Port Adelaide in March 1853

He worked for several years as Clement Sabine & Co., customs and shipping agent, then from 1857 to 1894 as Adelaide agent for pastoralist and absentee landowner Price Maurice (1818–1894), who had sheep runs near Coffin's Bay and was largely responsible for the rise of Angora goat farming and breeding in South Australia.

Properties managed by Sabine for Maurice included Pekina, O'Laddie. Tarcowie, Warrow, Lake Hamilton, Branfield, and "the ill-fated" Mt. Eba station.

In 1900 he left for South Africa, to investigate purchase land there post-war, concluding it was hopeless.

In 1902 he was found insolvent, and around the same time moved from "Rieti", Glenelg to Second Avenue, East Adelaide.

He died aged 72 of ptomaine poisoning at his home in Second Avenue, East Adelaide and was buried in the Brighton cemetery.

Other interests
Sabine was a
foundation member of the  Chamber of Commerce, and the South Australian Pastoralists' Association of which he was hon. secretary from its foundation in 1859 and wound it up in 1865. 
founder of the Bushmen's Club, whose premises at south-east corner of Whitmore Square, formerly the residence of Sir Charles Cooper, were opened in May 1870.
director of the Pastoralists' Association
director of the Adelaide, Glenelg and Suburban Railway Company, later Glenelg Railway Company, Limited
member of the Royal Agricultural and Horticultural Society, and largely responsible for introducing a third Show in August to suit sheepfarmers, in addition to those in February and October.
councillor for the New Glenely Ward of the Glenelg Council, in which area he had a villa built 
director of the Glenelg Bathing Company, and its chairman
director of Elder, Smith, & Co., Limited
council member of the Royal Geographical Society of Australasia, SA Branch, and served with Samuel Tomkinson as hon. auditors.
an underwriter of the 1887 Adelaide Jubilee International Exhibition, also involved in organising South Australian representation at Melbourne and Sydney Exhibitions

Family
John Sabine (14 June 1791 – 20 May 1856) married Adelaide Isham Eppes (c. 1797 – 21 December 1885), lived in Felixstow. She and the wife of Rev. T. Q. Stow were sisters. Their family included:
John Randolph Sabine (24 September 1824 – ) married Catherine Hardcastle ( – ) on 12 December 1854
Mary Isham Sabine (18 October 1829 – 30 July 1923) married Dr. Andrew Garran MLC (19 November 1825 – 6 June 1901) of Sydney on 1 December 1854
Edith Brewer Sabine (1831 – 20 February 1901) died at Glenelg.
Clement Sabine (11 January 1833 – 27 November 1903) married Anne Glenn "Annie" Clark (4 November 1843 – 4 December 1921) on 6 March 1862. She was a daughter of brewer W. H. Clark; she died at Canowindra, New South Wales.
(Clement) Egbert Eppes Sabine LLB (16 December 1862 – 12 May 1898) was a prize-winning student at Adelaide Educational Institution. He sued one Dr. T. K. Hamilton for unskilfully and negligently administering potassium bromide and injecting him with strychnine and "pelicarpine" (perhaps pilocarpine) in dangerous quantities, leaving him weak and unable to work. He died five years later.
Andrew Garran Sabine (8 January 1864 – 25 June 1921) in South Africa, died at "Tingalha", Canowindra
Adelaide Isham Mary Sabine (18 February 1866 – 1866)
Ernest Maurice Sabine (7 September 1867 – 1957) LLB, SM of "Berkeley," Cheltenham street, Malvern married Elsie Muriel Pansa on 30 May 1940 (at 80? really?) 
Edith Ethelwyn Sabine (9 March 1870 – 16 March 1934) died in London
Mary  Sabine (1 October 1871– ) married pastoralist Hamilton Hope Osborne ( –1916) on 20 July 1898, moved to New South Wales
Charles Glenn "Charlie" Sabine (15 March 1875 – 6 September 1931) died in Ryde, New South Wales
Robert Routh Sabine (11 October 1876 – 5 April 1941) married Elizabeth "Lil" Doyle ( – ) on 10 January 1906, lived in Western Australia, died in Melbourne
Adelaide Isham Elizabeth Sabine (15 June 1878 – 3 February 1921) died at Canowindra
Helen Sabine (22 January 1880– ) born in Wakefield Street, married Edward Gibbon Wakefield (1874– ), son of Salvator Rosa Wakefield ( –1898), on 25 June 1901
Alice Katherine Anne Sabine (1882– ) married Herbert David Crossley ( – ) on 3 April 1913
Eustace Powhatan Sabine (20 January 1838 – 19 September 1902) married Charlotte Isabel MacGeorge (1842 – 5 September 1930) He was an Adelaide businessman, she was a daughter of Robert Forsyth Macgeorge.
Eric Sabine (1867–1939) married Gertrude Celia Scott ( –1930) in 1899
Annie Sabine (1869– )
Rupert Sabine (1870– )
Edgar Sabine (1873– ) married Kate Mary Poole ( – 7 July 1951) on 18 June 1906. She was the eldest daughter of Rev. F. Slaney Poole
Harry Sabine (1875– )

References 

1831 births
1903 deaths
Australian pastoralists
19th-century Australian businesspeople